Torralba can refer to:

Places

Italy
 Torralba, Sardinia, a comune in the Province of Sassari

Spain
 , a town in the municipality of Úbeda in the province of Jaén
 Torralba (Cuenca), a town in the province of Cuenca, Castile-La Mancha
 Torralba and Ambrona (archaeological site), an archaeological site in Soria, Castile and León
 Torralba de Aragón, a town in the province of Huesca, Aragon
 , a village in the municipality of Burgo de Osma in the province of Soria
 Torralba de Arciel, a town in the municipality of Gómara, Soria
 Torralba de Calatrava, a town in Ciudad Real, Castile-La Mancha
 Torralba de los Frailes, a town in the province of Zaragoza, Aragon
 Torralba de los Sisones, a town in the province of Teruel, Aragon
 Torralba de Oropesa, a town in the province of Toledo, Castile-La Mancha
 Torralba de Ribota, a town in the province of Zaragoza, Aragon
 Torralba del Moral, a town in the municipality of Medinaceli in the province of Soria
 Torralba Del Río, a town in Navarre
 Torralba del Pinar, a town in the comarca of Alto Mijares, Castellón, Valencia
 , a town in the municipality of Villatorres in the province of Jaén

See also
 Torralba (surname)